The Samoan women's national cricket team, nicknamed the Nafanua, represents the country of Samoa in international women's cricket. It is organised by the game's governing body in the country, the Samoa International Cricket Association (SICA).

Although women's cricket has a long history in Samoa, the national team was only formally organised in 2010, with assistance from a New Zealand association, Auckland Cricket. The team has often included Samoan expatriate players based in Australia and New Zealand (including some who have played for state or provincial teams), which has presented difficulties in training. Samoa's first regional tournament came later in 2010, and it has since regularly participated in ICC East Asia-Pacific events, generally ranking behind only Japan and Papua New Guinea in the region. Its most notable achievement is winning the gold medal in the women's tournament at the 2015 Pacific Games. The team is currently coached by Ian West, an Englishman who gained Samoan citizenship through his wife, and subsequently played for the Samoan men's team. , one unofficial ranking system places Samoa 27th in the world, behind Kenya.

In April 2018, the International Cricket Council (ICC) granted full Women's Twenty20 International (WT20I) status to all its members. Therefore, all Twenty20 matches played between Samoa women and another international side since 1 July 2018 has been a full WT20I.

History

Cricket has been played in Samoa since the 19th century, when it was introduced by British traders and missionaries. It flourished despite a ban during the period of the German protectorate, from 1900 to 1914. Historically, the sport has been most popular when played under the modified rules known as kilikiti. However, since the early 2000s, when Samoa gained affiliate membership of the International Cricket Council (ICC) and its men's national team debuted internationally (in 2000 and 2001, respectively), the standard form of cricket has begun to replace kilikiti in popularity.

The Samoan women's team played its first international matches in February 2010, when Fiji toured to play a three-match series at Apia's Faleata Oval (in the Tuanaimato area). Fiji were also playing their first internationals. A major impetus for the establishment of a woman's team was its status as a requirement for associate membership of the ICC, to which SICA aspires. Samoa, captained by Perelini Mulitalo, went on to win the series 3–0, and consequently qualified as the third team (after Japan and Papua New Guinea) for the 2010 EAP Trophy in Japan, the team's first major tournament.

Samoa went on to lose all three of its matches at the EAP Trophy, a 50-over tournament, with their closest game being a 12-run loss to Japan in the qualifying final. Their captain there was Mindy Hodgson, a former representative of the Wellington Blaze in New Zealand domestic cricket. However, the Samoans were more successful at their next regional tournament, the 2012 EAP Women's Championship in Port Vila, Vanuatu. That tournament was played using the Twenty20 format, with the winner progressing to the 2013 World Twenty20 Qualifier in Ireland). The three teams from the 2010 tournament were joined by the Cook Islands, Fiji, and Vanuatu. Samoa won all of its group-stage matches (played only against the three newcomers), but lost its semi-final against Papua New Guinea, eventually placing third after defeating Vanuatu in the third-place playoff.

At the 2014 EAP Women's Championship in Japan (a qualifier for the 2015 World Twenty20 Qualifier), Samoa again placed third after losing a semi-final to Papua New Guinea, with their opponent in the third-place playoff being the Cook Islands. The team's tournament was marked by several instances of individual brilliance, most notably an innings of 104 (from 74 balls) by Moelagi Tuilagi in the playoff, the first century in an EAP Twenty20 event. Samoa's captain, Auckland Hearts player Regina Lili'i, was named both player of the tournament and captain of the team of the tournament. Lili'i was one of three Samoan players with experience in the New Zealand State League, the others being Hana Mauafu (Canterbury Magicians) and Madeleine Chapman (Wellington Blaze). In July 2015, Samoa won the gold medal in the women's tournament at the 2015 Pacific Games in Port Moresby, becoming the first country outside of Papua New Guinea to win gold in Pacific Games cricket.

In December 2020, the ICC announced the qualification pathway for the 2023 ICC Women's T20 World Cup. Samoa were named in the 2021 ICC Women's T20 World Cup EAP Qualifier regional group, alongside seven other teams.

Tournament history

EAP Women's Championship
 2010: 3rd place (3 teams)
 2012: 3rd place (6 teams)
 2014: 3rd place (5 teams)
 2016: 2nd place (3 teams)

Pacific Games
 2015: Gold medal (6 teams)
 2019: Gold medal (4 teams)

Records and Statistics 

International Match Summary — Samoa Women
 
Last updated 18 March 2023

Twenty20 International 

Highest team total: 140/7 v Fiji on 5 October at Vanuatu Cricket Ground, Port Vila.
Highest individual innings: 51, Regina Lili'i v Fiji on 12 July 2019 at Faleata Oval No 1, Apia.
Best innings bowling: 4/9, Ailaoa Aoina v Fiji on 5 October at Vanuatu Cricket Ground, Port Vila.

Most T20I runs for Samoa Women

Most T20I wickets for Samoa Women

T20I record versus other nations

Records complete to WT20I #1387. Last updated 18 March 2023.

See also
 List of Samoa women Twenty20 International cricketers

References

Women's national cricket teams
Cricket, women

Samoa in international cricket
Women's sport in Samoa